Borghild Tenden (born 23 June 1951 in Stryn) is a Norwegian politician for the Liberal Party.

She served as a deputy representative to the Norwegian Parliament from Akershus from 1997 to 2001, and was elected as a full representative in 2005. She served as the first deputy chair the Standing Committee on Transport and Communications.

Although the 2009 parliamentary election ended badly for the Liberal Party, Tenden won a seat in Akershus. She and Trine Skei Grande from Oslo made up the Liberal Party's parliamentary delegation.

In 2013 she was offered the second ballot spot behind Abid Raja. She declined and retired from politics.

References

1951 births
Living people
Members of the Storting
Liberal Party (Norway) politicians
Bærum politicians
Women members of the Storting
21st-century Norwegian politicians
21st-century Norwegian women politicians
People from Stryn